The 1953 Lamar Tech Cardinals football team was an American football team that represented Lamar State College of Technology (now known as Lamar University) during the 1953 college football season as a member of the Lone Star Conference. In their first year under head coach James B. Higgins, the team compiled a 3–7 record.

Schedule

References

Lamar
Lamar Cardinals football seasons
Lamar Tech Cardinals football